Masjid Jamek LRT station is a rapid transit station in Kuala Lumpur, Malaysia. It is the interchange station between two of Rapid KL's light rapid transit (LRT) systems, namely the LRT Ampang and Sri Petaling Lines and the LRT Kelana Jaya Line. The station is one of only two stations integrating the LRT lines, the other being Putra Heights station. The station is situated near and named after the Masjid Jamek in central Kuala Lumpur.

Despite being called an interchange station, up until 28 November 2011, there were effectively two Masjid Jamek stations in operational terms. An elevated Masjid Jamek station served the Ampang and Sri Petaling Lines while an underground Masjid Jamek station served the Kelana Jaya Line, each having their respective ticketing systems, which were not integrated. Commuters had to exit one system, and purchase a new ticket before entering the other system if they wanted to transfer from one line to the other.

Prior to 2006, when a plaza was built above the Klang River linking the stations, Ampang Line and Sri Petaling Line's Masjid Jamek station and Kelana Jaya Line's Masjid Jamek station were two physically separate buildings. There were limited pedestrian walkways between the two stations resulting in commuters having to be exposed to the sun and rain and even having to cross the busy Jalan Tun Perak to change from one line to the other.

On 28 November 2011, the fare gates that separated the two systems were removed, and the plaza that physically linked the two stations became part of the "paid (or restricted) zone" of a physically integrated Masjid Jamek station. This allowed commuters to transfer from one line to another without leaving the system for the first time since the two stations became operational.

History

Ampang Line and Sri Petaling Line station 

Opened on 16 December 1996 as part of the first phase of the then STAR system (Phase 1), the Ampang and Sri Petaling Line station was constructed directly above a bridge along Jalan Tun Perak that crosses the Klang River shortly before the Klang River-Gombak River confluence: Its elevated tracks and side platforms are suspended above Jalan Tun Perak, while the ticketing concourses are located over the Klang River, at street level.

The station, similar to surface-level stations from the Chan Sow Lin-Ampang route, has one ticketing concourse for each of the two platforms. The two concourses and their exits are located on both sides of Jalan Tun Perak, and were previously not integrated. The northern concourse and platform is designated for trains bound for either the Ampang and Putra Heights (previously, Sri Petaling station) stations, while the southern concourse and platform are designated for trains bound for the Sentul Timur station at the northern end of the line.

Kelana Jaya Line station 

The second Masjid Jamek rapid transit station was opened on 1 June 1999 as part of the second phase of the Kelana Jaya Line (then known as PUTRA LRT) (known as Section 2).

The Kelana Jaya Line station, like other stations along the subway stretch of the Kelana Jaya Line, is an underground rapid transit station that consists of a single island platform (separated from the tracks by platform screen doors) connected to a single ticketing concourse via stairways, escalators and an elevator.

The main entrance of the Kelana Jaya Line station was situated directly north of the Ampang and Sri Petaling Lines station, exiting into Jalan Melaka, and Jalan Melayu via a footbridge over the Klang River. This access has now been converted into the transit plaza. It is directly connected with the former concourse for Platform 2 (Ampang- and Putra Heights-bound platform) of the Ampang and Sri Petaling Lines. A secondary access point was located south of the Ampang and Sri Petaling Line station on the other side of Jalan Tun Perak, connected to the station's ticketing concourse via a long tunnel that passes underneath Jalan Tun Perak. The tunnel has since been converted into a paid or restricted area connection for transfers between the Kelana Jaya Line and Platform 1 (Sentul Timur-bound platform) of the Ampang and Sri Petaling Lines. As such, the former exit at the end of the tunnel to Jalan Benteng has been closed. (see below)

Integrated Masjid Jamek station

Despite the proximity of the Masjid Jamek Ampang and Sri Petaling Line and Masjid Jamek Kelana Jaya Line stations, they were essentially two separate stations operating independently from each other, which did not provide any transfer convenience to passengers switching from one line to the other. In fact, even passengers on the Ampang Line and Sri Petaling who wanted to change their direction of travel at this station could not do so without exiting the turnstiles at the concourse of one side of Jalan Tun Perak, crossing Jalan Tun Perak, and then buying a new ticket at the concourse on the other side of the road to resume their journey.

When Syarikat Prasarana Negara Berhad took over the ownership of both the Ampang Line and Kelana Jaya Line, the opportunity came to integrate the two lines physically and in terms of ticketing systems. In November 2006, construction of a plaza over the Klang River which would eventually create a physical linkage between the Kelana Jaya Line station with the concourse of Platform 2 of the Ampang and Sri Petaling Lines station, began. Called Phase 1 of the Integrated Masjid Jamek station project, the works were completed in October 2008 and the plaza was opened to the public on 15 November 2008. However, as the two lines still had two separate ticketing systems, the actual physical linkage could not be opened and both stations still had separate entrances.

Phase 2 of efforts to integrate the two Masjid Jamek stations, which began in April 2010, then saw the physical linking up of the plaza with the concourse for Ampang- and then Sri Petaling-bound trains of the then Ampang Line (Platform 2); the reconfiguration of the entrances, turnstiles and ticketing office of this concourse; and the raising of the floor level of this concourse to be the same level as the plaza. The station was also upgraded to include lifts and ramps to make it accessible to the disabled.

The final steps in the integration process involved the relocation of the turnstiles for the Kelana Jaya Line from Level B1 to the Ground Level Transit Plaza. This essentially converted the entire Level B1 of the Kelana Jaya Line station into a paid area (previously, it was partially paid and unpaid). At the same time, part of the Ground Level Plaza became a paid area with the new entrance into the Kelana Jaya Line (as well as the entrance for Ampang- and then Sri Petaling-bound trains of the Ampang Line) being relocated to this level. The underpass, which previously allowed passengers to access Jalan Benteng without needing to cross Jalan Tun Perak from the Kelana Jaya concourse Level B1 was converted into a paid area for passengers transferring between the Kelana Jaya Line and the Ampang Line Station Platform 1 (Sentul Timur-bound). As the underpass was now a restricted area, access to and from Jalan Benteng was sealed-off. The Kelana Jaya Line ticketing office on Level B1 was then closed and integrated with what was previously the Ampang Line ticketing office at the Ground Level Plaza.

On 28 November 2011, the integration process was completed. For the first time, passengers from the Kelana Jaya Line could transfer onto the Ampang and Sri Petaling Lines and vice versa without needing to buy new tickets.

Station layout

Bus services
Masjid Jamek station is adjacent to two bus hubs: Old Market Square bus hub, in front of the headquarters of HSBC Bank Malaysia, and the Kota Raya bus hub. Trunk bus routes radiate (and converge) here from adjacent suburbs and towns e.g. Sungai Buloh, Ampang, Segambut/Mont Kiara, Kuala Selangor, Kajang, Putrajaya, Subang Jaya and Jalan Klang Lama.

Medan Pasar Bus Hub

Additional images

Around the Station
 HSBC Bank (1912 - 2022, since relocated to Tun Razak Exchange)
 DBKL City Theatre
 Exchange Square
 Kuala Lumpur Library
 Merdeka Square
 National History Museum
 Saint John's Cathedral
 Saint Mary's Cathedral
 Sultan Abdul Samad Building
 Sultan Abdul Samad Jamek Mosque
 Telekom Museum

References

Kelana Jaya Line
Ampang Line
Railway stations opened in 1996
1996 establishments in Malaysia